Holosoma is a genus of ground beetles in the family Carabidae. There are 11 described species in Holosoma, 10 found in China and 1 from the Philippines.

Species
These 11 species belong to the genus Holosoma:
 Holosoma boettcheri Jedlicka, 1936  (Philippines)
 Holosoma hedini (Andrewes, 1935)  (China)
 Holosoma heros Kirschenhofer, 1995  (China)
 Holosoma imurai N.Ito, 2003  (China)
 Holosoma misaoae N.Ito, 2012  (China)
 Holosoma namikoae N.Ito, 2012  (China)
 Holosoma nigritum N.Ito, 2003  (China)
 Holosoma opacum Semenov, 1889  (China)
 Holosoma sciakyi Kirschenhofer, 1995  (China)
 Holosoma speciosum N.Ito, 2003  (China)
 Holosoma weigoldi (Heller, 1923)  (China)

References

Licininae